Radio Salone (2012) is the third album from Sierra Leone's Refugee All Stars. It was produced by artist and producer Victor Axelrod aka "Ticklah," who has worked with Sharon Jones & The Dap-Kings, Amy Winehouse and the Easy Star All Stars, and recorded at Dunham Studios in Brooklyn, NY.

With two records in their pockets, Sierra Leone's Refugee All Stars blend the vibrant sounds of traditional West Africa, along with all the grooves they have picked up throughout their travels since their formation in the Guinean Sembakounya Refugee Camp. The title, "Salone" stands for Sierra Leone in Krio shorthand, and is combined with "Radio" to acknowledge the important role of radios as a connection to the outside world during the civil war.

Track listing

References

Sierra Leone's Refugee All Stars albums
2012 albums